Claude-Edmonde Magny, real name Edmonde Vinel (1913–1966) was a French woman of letters.

Biography

An agrégée in philosophy, she taught on the eve of the war at the Rennes high school. She participated in the Congress Esprit at Jouy-en-Josas in 1939, where the joung Jorge Semprún met her (He later gave an account of their relations in ). In the spring of 1940, she began her collaboration with the magazine Esprit under the pseudonym Claude-Edmonde Magny, alternating reflection articles (about Aldous Huxley in February) and notes on recent literary works. After the war, and until 1951, she gave Esprit a dozen articles on Georges Bataille, the writers of the deportation and Sartre, Joyce, Malraux, Mauriac, Balzac. They were mostly taken up in a posthumous collection, with those published in Poésie 46 and 47, in Preuves and other magazines.

She was a tutor of French at Newnham College, Cambridge. Her students included cognitive psychologist Anne Treisman.

Selected works 
1949: L'âge d'or du roman américain, Prix Sainte-Beuve
 Lettre sur le pouvoir d'écrire, Paris, Éditions Flammarion, series "Climats", 2012, 
 Littérature et critique, Paris, Éditions Payot, 1971

External links 
 Le fonds de Claude-Edmonde Magny de la bibliothèque universitaire d'Angers
 Claude Edmonde Magny on Babelio
  Lettre sur le pouvoir d'écrire on Le Matricule des anges
 Lettre sur le pouvoir d'écrire

20th-century French women writers
20th-century French writers
École Normale Supérieure alumni
French literary critics
Prix Sainte-Beuve winners
1913 births
1966 deaths
Place of birth missing
Place of death missing
Pseudonymous women writers
20th-century pseudonymous writers